Dargie is a Scottish surname. Notable people with the surname include:

Horrie Dargie (1917–1999), Australian musician
Ian Dargie (born 1963), Australian rules footballer
Ian Dargie (footballer, born 1931), English footballer
William Dargie (1912–2003), Australian painter
William E. Dargie (1854–1911), American newspaper publisher and politician

English-language surnames
Scottish surnames